Yishun Stadium is a multi-purpose stadium in Yishun, Singapore, within the vicinity of Khatib MRT station. The stadium has a capacity of 3,400.

History
 1996 to 2003: Home to the Sembawang Rangers FC.
 2006 S.League Season: Sporting Afrique FC played their home games at the stadium.
 2007 to 2009: Home to the Super Reds FC.
 2010 S.League Season: Beijing Guoan FC (Singapore) played their home games at the stadium.
 2012 S.League Season: Young Tigers A played their home games at the stadium.
 2015 S.League Season: Home United moved from Bishan Stadium to Yishun Stadium as their primary stadium.

References

Football venues in Singapore
Yishun
Multi-purpose stadiums in Singapore
Singapore Premier League venues
Sembawang Rangers FC